This is a list of diplomatic missions of Somalia, excluding honorary consulates. Foreign relations of Somalia are handled primarily by the President as the head of state, the Prime Minister as the head of government, and the Minister of Foreign Affairs of the Federal Government.

According to Article 54 of the national constitution, the allocation of powers and resources between the Federal Government and the Federal Republic of Somalia's constituent Federal Member States shall be negotiated and agreed upon by the Federal Government and the Federal Member States, except in matters pertaining to foreign affairs, national defense, citizenship and immigration, and monetary policy. Article 53 also stipulates that the Federal Government shall consult the Federal Member States on major issues related to international agreements, including negotiations vis-a-vis foreign trade, finance and treaties.

Somaliland, a self-declared sovereign state that is internationally recognised as an autonomous region of Somalia, maintains consulate-level informal relations with some foreign governments. However, its self-proclaimed independence remains unrecognised by any country or international organisation.

Diplomatic relations 
The following is a list of countries outside of Africa which Somalia maintains diplomatic relations with:

Bilateral relations

Africa

Americas

Asia

Europe

International organization membership
Somalia is a member of a number of international organizations, such as the United Nations, African Union, and Arab League. Other memberships include the African Development Bank, UNESCO, the UNHCR and the World Health Organization.

See also
List of diplomatic missions in Somalia
List of diplomatic missions of Somalia

Notes

External links

Somali - U.S. Relations from the Dean Peter Krogh Foreign Affairs Digital Archives